New Bolingbroke is a village in the East Lindsey district of Lincolnshire, England. The village was established by John Parkinson, who was a steward to Sir Joseph Banks. It is in the civil parish of Carrington.

Landmarks
Built in the 1820s, the village hall continues to be called the Town Hall, the name it was given when John Parkinson established New Bolingbroke with the aspiration of it becoming a market town. It is a Grade II listed building.

New Bolingbroke Church, dedicated to St Peter, was built in 1854 by Samuel Sanders Teulon. It is a Grade II listed building.

The Crescent, a curved line of red-brick shops and houses, was built in 1823 by John Parkinson to house the workers of his weaving factory; the  houses are now all privately owned. The Crescent is Grade II listed.

New Bolingbroke had two working windmills. One, Rundles Mill, is Grade II Listed and dates from the mid-19th century, and has been disused since at least 1906.  Made of red brick, it is a tower mill. The other, Watkinsons Mill, dates from 1821 and is also Grade II listed.  It was working until 1944 when the weather beam broke. It continued with an engine for a time, but today only the stump remains, which is used as a store.

New Bolingbroke railway station was sited here.

See also
New Bolingbroke railway station

References

External links

Villages in Lincolnshire
Windmills in Lincolnshire
East Lindsey District